Philip Blake Morrison FRSL (born 8 October 1950) is an English poet and author who has published in a wide range of fiction and non-fiction genres. His greatest success came with the publication of his memoirs And When Did You Last See Your Father?, which won the J. R. Ackerley Prize for Autobiography. He has also written a study of the murder of James Bulger, As If. Since 2003, Morrison has been Professor of Creative and Life Writing at Goldsmiths College, University of London. He is a Fellow of the Royal Society of Literature.

Life and career
Morrison was born in Skipton, North Yorkshire, to an English father and an Irish mother. His parents were both physicians; his mother's maiden name was Agnes O'Shea, but her husband persuaded her to change "Agnes" to "Kim". The details of his mother's life in Ireland, to which Morrison had not been privy, formed the basis for his memoir, Things My Mother Never Told Me.

Morrison lived in Thornton-in-Craven and attended Ermysted's Grammar School. He later studied English literature at the University of Nottingham and UCL. He worked for The Times Literary Supplement (1978–81) and was literary editor of both The Observer (1981–89) and the Independent on Sunday (1989–95). Morrison's early writing career outside of journalism was as a poet and poetry critic. He became a full-time writer in 1995 and has since produced novels and volumes of autobiography as well as plays, libretti, and writing for television. He has contributed articles to The New Yorker, the London Review of Books, the New Statesman, The New York Times and Poetry Review and since 2001 he has written regularly for The Guardian. In 2003 he became Professor of Creative and Life Writing at Goldsmiths College, London, and in 2008 he became chair of The Reader Organisation, the UK centre for research and promotion of reading as a therapeutic activity. In 2006 he was awarded an Honorary Doctorate of Arts by Plymouth University.

Morrison is Patron of Guildford-based educational, cultural and social community hub, The Guildford Institute.

Published works
His first book was The Movement: English Poetry and Fiction of the 1950s (Oxford University Press, 1980). This was followed in 1982 by a critical guide to Seamus Heaney's poetry. Also in 1982 he co-edited The Penguin Book of Contemporary British Poetry with Andrew Motion. Morrison's first book of poetry, Dark Glasses, was published by Chatto and Windus in 1984. Other published works include Ballad of the Yorkshire Ripper (1986), written in Yorkshire dialect, and Pendle Witches (1996), illustrated with etchings by Paula Rego. His poems have also appeared in several anthologies, including Penguin Modern Poets 1 (1995).

His first novel was The Justification of Johann Gutenberg (Chatto & Windus, 2000), a fictionalized account of the life of Johannes Gutenberg. South of the River, described by The Observer as "a fat summer read of a novel, panoramic and commercial", was published in April 2007.

Film, television and theatre adaptations
His 1993 memoir And When Did You Last See Your Father? was made into a film of the same name starring Jim Broadbent as Morrison's father, Juliet Stevenson as his mother, Gina McKee as his wife, Sarah Lancashire as Aunty Beaty, and Colin Firth and Matthew Beard playing Blake Morrison himself as an adult and teenager, respectively.
It was directed by Anand Tucker, produced by Elizabeth Karlsson, with a screenplay by David Nicholls. Filming took place in Cromford, Derbyshire, and the surrounding area. The film was released in 2007.

A three-part television adaptation of Morrison's 2010 novel The Last Weekend was shown on ITV1 in August–September 2012.

The TV series of Morrison's novel South of the River is being made by World Productions and adapted by screenwriter Danny Brocklehurst.

Bibliography
The Movement: English Poetry and Fiction of the 1950s (Oxford University Press, 1980)
Seamus Heaney (Methuen, 1982)
The Penguin Book of Contemporary British Poetry (co-editor with Andrew Motion) (Penguin, 1982)
Dark Glasses (Chatto & Windus, 1984)
The Ballad of the Yorkshire Ripper (and Other Poems) (Chatto & Windus, 1987)
The Yellow House (illustrations by Helen Craig) (Walker Books, 1987)
And When Did You Last See Your Father? (Granta, 1993)
Penguin Modern Poets 1 (Morrison, James Fenton, Kit Wright) (Penguin, 1995)
Mind Readings: Writers' Journeys Through Mental States (co-editor with Sara Dunn and Michèle Roberts) (Minerva, 1996)
Pendle Witches (illustrations by Paula Rego) (Enitharmon Press, 1996)
The Cracked Pot (Samuel French, 1996)
As If (Granta, 1997)
Too True (Granta, 1998)
Selected Poems (Granta, 1999)
The Justification of Johann Gutenberg (Chatto & Windus, 2000)
Things My Mother Never Told Me (Chatto & Windus, 2002)
Antigone and Oedipus (Northern Broadsides, 2003)
South of the River (Chatto & Windus, 2007)
The Last Weekend (Chatto & Windus, 2010)
The Executor (Chatto & Windus, 2018)
Two Sisters (Borough Press, 2023)

Awards

 1980 Eric Gregory Award
 1985 Dylan Thomas Award
 1985 Somerset Maugham Award for Dark Glasses
 1988 E. M. Forster Award
 1993 Esquire/Volvo/Waterstone's Non-Fiction Book Award for And When Did You Last See Your Father?
 1994 J. R. Ackerley Prize for Autobiography for And When Did You Last See Your Father?

References

External links
Blake Morrison's official website

Blake Morrison reading at writLOUD in London
Video of Blake Morrison talking about The Last Weekend to The Interview Online
 Archival Material at 

1950 births
Living people
20th-century English male writers
20th-century English poets
21st-century English male writers
21st-century English novelists
21st-century English poets
Academics of Goldsmiths, University of London
Alumni of the University of Nottingham
Alumni of University College London
British people of Irish descent
English male non-fiction writers
English male novelists
English male poets
English memoirists
English people of Irish descent
Fellows of the Royal Society of Literature
Granta people
People educated at Ermysted's Grammar School
People from Skipton